An Dara Craiceann (or An Dara Craiceann: Beneath The Surface) is the second studio album by Irish singer Pádraigín Ní Uallacháin. The tracks on the album are a mixture of accompanied and unaccompanied songs, and musical recordings of Irish poet Nuala Ní Dhomhnaill's poems.

Track listing
"Ná tar ach san oíche" (Come only at night)
"Éireoidh mé amárach" (I will rise tomorrow)
"A óganaigh óig" (Young man)
"Nach aoibhinn don éanlaith" (How pleasant for the birds)
"Éirigh, a Shinéid" (Rise up Jane)
"Úirchill a' Chreagáin" (Creggan graveyard)
"An bád sí" (The fairy boat)
"Tá an oíche seo dorcha" (This night is dark)
"A bhean údaí thall" (Oh yonder woman)
"Tá daoine a' rá" (Some people say)
"A Mhuire 's a Rí" (If I had fingers)
"An bhean chaointe" (The keening woman)
"Coillte glas a' Triúcha" (The green woods of Trugh)
"Tá sé in am domsa éirí" (It is time to rise)
"A chara dhílis" (My beloved friend)

Personnel 
Pádraigín Ní Uallacháin – Vocals, arranger, Liner Notes, Translation
Jackie Daly – Accordion
Jimmy Faulkner – Guitar
Manus McGuire – Fiddle
Seamus McGuire – Fiddle
Martin Murray – Engineer, Mandolin
Garry Ó Briain – Arranger, Guitar, Keyboards, Mandocello, Mandolin
Adele O'Dwyer – Cello
Frances Lambe – Artwork

References

External links
 An Dara Craiceann – official website

1995 albums
Pádraigín Ní Uallacháin albums